The 2003 Bucknell Bison football team was an American football team that represented Bucknell University during the 2003 NCAA Division I-AA football season. Bucknell tied for third in the Patriot League.

In their first year under head coach Tim Landis, the Bison compiled a 6–6 record. Tim Johnson and Mike Leatherman were the team captains.

The Bison outscored opponents 299 to 284. Bucknell's 4–3 conference record tied for second out of eight in the Patriot League standings.

Bucknell played its home games at Christy Mathewson–Memorial Stadium on the university campus in Lewisburg, Pennsylvania.

Schedule

References

Bucknell
Bucknell Bison football seasons
Bucknell Bison football